Sebastian Mayer (born 16 July 1973 in Regensburg) is a German rower. Together with Stefan Roehnert he finished 4th in the men's double sculls at the 2000 Summer Olympics.

References
 
 

1973 births
Living people
German male rowers
Sportspeople from Regensburg
Rowers at the 1996 Summer Olympics
Rowers at the 2000 Summer Olympics
Olympic rowers of Germany
World Rowing Championships medalists for Germany